Aud or AUD may refer to:

Universities
 Ambedkar University Delhi
 American University in Dubai

Ships
 SS Aud, a 1907 Norwegian merchant ship
 SS Libau, a German merchant ship which was disguised as the Aud in an arms trafficking operation.

People
 Aud (given name), list of people with the given name 
 Anya Jenkins or Aud, a character in the Buffy: The Vampire Slayer TV series

Other uses
 AUD, ISO 4217 currency code for the Australian dollar
 Aud, Missouri, a community in the United States
 Audley End railway station, Essex, England (National Rail station code AUD)
 Doctor of Audiology (Au.D.)
 Alcohol use disorder
 Aud Publishing, an imprint of VDM Publishing devoted to the reproduction of Wikipedia content
 KAUD (FM), a radio station in Mexico, Missouri
 WAUD, a radio station in Auburn, Alabama
 Buffalo Memorial Auditorium, known as "The Aud"
 Kitchener Memorial Auditorium Complex, known as "The Aud"